Sutepe is a village in the Gerger District, Adıyaman Province, Turkey. The village is populated by Kurds of the Mirdêsî tribe and had a population of 297 in 2021.

The hamlet of Çavuş is attached to Sutepe.

References

Villages in Gerger District
Kurdish settlements in Adıyaman Province